The Dutch Eerste Divisie in the 1962–63 season was contested by 16 teams. Teams from the two leagues were united in one national Division for the first time this season. DWS won the championship for the first time.

Entrants in the new national league
The following teams entered the new national Eerste Divisie, mainly from the A- and B-division from last season (1961–62):

[Tweede] Champions of the 1961–62 Tweede Divisie 
[Eredivisie] Relegated from the 1961–62 Eredivisie

League standings

See also
 1962–63 Eredivisie
 1962–63 Tweede Divisie

References
Netherlands - List of final tables (RSSSF)

Eerste Divisie seasons
2
Neth